The following people were born in, residents of, or closely associated with Columbia, South Carolina.

Government and law 

 Weston Adams, United States ambassador
 Stephen K. Benjamin, politician, mayor of Columbia
 John T. Campbell, politician, mayor of Columbia
 Bob Coble, politician, mayor of Columbia
 John E. Courson, politician, President Pro Tempore of the South Carolina Senate
 Kirkman Finlay, Jr., politician, mayor of Columbia
 Robert H. Hodges, Jr., federal judge
 Henry McMaster, incumbent governor of South Carolina, since 2017
 Matthew J. Perry, lawyer, judge
 Carol Rasco, director of the Domestic Policy Council under President Bill Clinton; advocate for disability rights, education, and children 
 Woodrow Wilson, 28th president of the United States
 Bill Workman, economic consultant, Greenville mayor; former Columbia resident

Film and acting 

 Julian Adams, film producer, writer, and actor
 Aziz Ansari, actor and comedian, Parks and Recreation
 Paul Benjamin, actor
 Anna Camp, actress, Pitch Perfect films
 Kelsey Chow, actress
 Mike Colter, actor
 Angell Conwell, actress
 Tyrone Corbin, NBA player and coach
 Kristin Davis, actress, Sex and the City
 Stanley Donen, film director and choreographer
 Michael Flessas, actor
 Ed Grady, actor
 Scott Holroyd, actor
 Fiona Hutchison, actress
 Elizabeth MacRae, actress
 Allison Munn, actress
 Gloria Saunders, actress
 Ann Savage, actress
 Sadie Stanley, actress 
 Josh Stolberg, screenwriter
 Robin Swicord, screenwriter
 Jonny Weston, actor 
 Lee Thompson Young, actor

Education 
 Clarissa Minnie Thompson Allen, writer and educator
 Mary Haskell, educator
 Steve Pettit, fifth president of Bob Jones University

Activism 
 Sarah Mae Flemming, civil rights activist
 Taylor Richardson, advocate, activist, speaker, student and philanthropist
 Tom Turnipseed, activist, formerly of State Senate
Modjeska Monteith Simkins, civil rights activist, Secretary of the South Carolina NAACP

Music 

 Atlas Road Crew, alternative rock, Southern rock band
 Bored Suburban Youth, hardcore punk band
 Ben Bridwell, lead singer of Band of Horses, alternative rock band
 Phillip Bush, pianist
 Crossfade, alternative metal/hard rock band
 Danny!, musician
 From Safety To Where, rock band
 Hootie & the Blowfish, band
 Danielle Howle, musician and songwriter
 Iron & Wine (Samuel Beam), indie rock musician 
 Alexis Jordan, singer
 Lil Ru, singer 
 The Movement, reggae band
 Chris Potter, musician
 The Sequence, early hip-hop female trio
 Zachary Stevens, heavy metal singer
 Angie Stone, singer 
 Stretch Arm Strong, hardcore punk band
 Toro y Moi, musician and songwriter
 Ron Westray, trombonist
 Young Jeezy, rapper, born in Columbia
 JetsonMade, producer

Art 
 Alicia Leeke, artist
 Guy Lipscomb, artist
 Brooklyn Mack, ballet dancer
 Ashley Tuttle, ballet dancer

Science and medicine 
 Charles F. Bolden, Jr., astronaut
 Tyrone Hayes, biologist
 Alonzo Clifton McClennan, doctor
 Kary Mullis, scientist (Nobel Prize winner/graduate of Dreher High School)
 John H. Yardley, pathologist

Military 
 Charles W. Bagnal, military officer and lawyer
 Arthur C. Davis, Navy admiral
 Maxcy Gregg, Civil War veteran
 Alexander Cheves Haskell, Civil War veteran
 Lloyd E. Jones, Army major general

Literature and publishing 

 Annie Maria Barnes, journalist, editor, and author
 James Dickey, poet, author of Deliverance in 1970, #42 on Modern Library's list of the 100 best 20th-Century novels.
 William Price Fox, novelist
 Terrance Hayes, poet
 Ed Madden, poet, professor, and editor
 Ryan Magee, editor
 John Henry McCray, African American newspaper journalist and publisher, politician, and civil rights activist 
 Ray McManus, poet
 Tom Poland, author 
 W. D. Workman, Jr., newspaper editor

Sports People 

 Ike Anderson, Olympic Greco-Roman wrestler
 Zinn Beck, MLB player, manager
 Ryan Bethea, professional football wide receiver
 Michael Boulware, NFL safety
 Peter Boulware, NFL linebacker, 4-time Pro Bowl, Super Bowl champion
 Bob Bowman, swim coach, best known as coach of Michael Phelps
 Zack Bowman, NFL cornerback
 Bruce Chen, Major League Baseball pitcher
 Dennis Daley, NFL offensive tackle
 Brad Edwards, NFL defensive back
 Alex English, NBA forward, member of Basketball Hall of Fame
 The Fabulous Moolah, WWE/WWF wrestler
 Samkon Gado, NFL running back
 Grayson Greiner, MLB catcher
 Kirby Higbe, MLB pitcher
 LaMarr Hoyt, MLB pitcher, AL Cy Young Award winner
 Hal Jeffcoat, MLB player
 Dustin Johnson, professional golfer
 Erik Kimrey, college football coach
 Savannah McCaskill, soccer player, member of USWNT
 Xavier McDaniel, NBA player
 BJ McKie, professional basketball player
 Jermaine O'Neal, NBA player, 6-time All-Star
 Zach Prince, USL Championship soccer player
 Brian Quick, NFL player
 Andre Roberts, NFL wide receiver, All-Pro kick returner
 Darell Scott, NFL defensive tackle
 Richard Seymour, NFL defensive tackle, 7-time Pro Bowl, 3-time Super Bowl champion
 Duce Staley, NFL player and coach
 Freddie Summers, NFL defensive back
 Channing Tindall, NFL linebacker
 Del Wilkes, pro wrestler

Other 
 Kimberly Clarice Aiken, Miss USA 1994
 Joseph Bernardin, Catholic cardinal
 Mark Cerney, founder of the Next of Kin Registry (NOKR)
 Craig Melvin, news anchor
 Dylann Roof, terrorist and white supremacist mass murderer behind the Charleston church shooting
 Ainsley Earhardt, news anchor

References

Columbia, South Carolina